Felsenburg Castle is a ruined castle in the municipality of Kandergrund of the Canton of Bern in Switzerland.  It is a Swiss heritage site of national significance.

History

Felsenburg castle was probably built in the 12th century for the Freiherr of Kien.  The castle was built on a rocky spire above the road over the Gemmi pass into Valais.  It was inherited, along with the rest of the Herrschaft of Frutigen, by the Freiherr of Wädenswil in 1290.  The Freiherr of Turn acquired it from Wädenswil in 1312.  It was mentioned in a record in 1339 as the castrum de Petra.  It was again mentioned in 1368 as Stein, German for Stone.  In 1400, Bern acquired the castle along with the rest of the Herrschaft.  They abandoned Felsenburg and allowed it fall into ruin.

Castle site
Currently, only the rectangular main tower and remnants of the outer walls are still standing.

See also
 List of castles in Switzerland

References

Cultural property of national significance in the canton of Bern
Castles in the Canton of Bern
Ruined castles in Switzerland